Mountain Shoals Plantation, also known as the James Nesbitt House, is a historic plantation house located at Enoree, Spartanburg County, South Carolina. It was built by 1837, and is a two-story, vernacular Federal style frame residence. It sits on a raised brick basement stuccoed to resemble granite and features a full-width, one-story, front porch. Also located on the property is a contributing well house and a one-story log cabin (c. 1815).

It was listed on the National Register of Historic Places in 1979.

References

Plantation houses in South Carolina
Houses on the National Register of Historic Places in South Carolina
Federal architecture in South Carolina
Houses completed in 1837
Houses in Spartanburg County, South Carolina
National Register of Historic Places in Spartanburg County, South Carolina